Line 16 of the Xi'an Metro is a rapid transit line that is currently under construction. It is expected to open in 2023.

History
On 12 June 2019, Line 16 (Phase 1) was approved by National Development and Reform Commission.

On 13 December 2019, construction of Line 16 (Phase 1) officially started.

On 16 March 2022, the station names for Line 16 (Phase 1) is officially announced.

Stations (north to south)

References

16